The 1975–76 season was Mansfield Town's 39th season in the Football League and 12th in the Third Division, they finished in 11th position with 47 points.

Final league table

Results

Football League Third Division

FA Cup

League Cup

Anglo-Scottish Cup

Squad statistics
 Squad list sourced from

References
General
 Mansfield Town 1975–76 at soccerbase.com (use drop down list to select relevant season)

Specific

Mansfield Town F.C. seasons
Mansfield Town